The Grey Ghost Streamer is an artificial fly, of the streamer type. Its primary function is to imitate smelt. The streamer's wing gives it a swimming action while trolling or using the Dead Drift technique.

The pattern is widespread and is popular along the Northeast of the United States. Many variations of the streamer occur, mostly to cut down on cost and tying time.

Origin
The streamer was first tied in 1924 by commercial fly tyer Carrie G. Stevens of Madison, Maine. She was the wife of Maine fishing guide, Wallace Stevens. She tied many other flies in a style known as the Rangeley style during her free time. Most of her streamers have the jungle cock cheeks in common. The streamer is regarded as one of her best creations. The pattern is mostly used for trout, of which it is successfully fished. When Stevens tested it at the Upper Dam pool she quickly hooked a 6 pound 13 ounce brook trout, which secured her second prize a Field & Stream competition. Afterwards she became even more involved with fly tying.

Materials
 Tag- flat silver tinsel
 Body- orange floss
 Ribbing- flat silver tinsel
 Belly Wing- white bucktail, golden pheasant crest, peacock herl
 Wing- olive-grey saddle hackle, golden pheasant crest
 Shoulder- white and black striped body feather from silver pheasant
 Cheeks- jungle cock

References

Streamer patterns